Simhasanam is a 1986 Indian Telugu-language epic historical film written, directed, edited, and produced by Krishna, who starred alongside Jaya Prada, Radha, and Mandakini. The film was simultaneously made in Hindi as Singhasan. Based on a folklore tale, the film released on 21 March 1986. Simhasanam is the first 70 mm stereophonic sound film in Telugu cinema.

Plot 
The kingdom of Dasarna has a brave and able army chief by the name of Vikrama Simha. Princess Alakananda Devi is in love with him. The chief minister contrives to dethrone the king and procure the throne for his son. But as long as Vikrama Singha is present, his plans cannot bear fruit. So he traps Vikrama Singha by getting false witnesses to testify that he has tried to kill the princess. Vikrama Simha is exiled.
Meanwhile, the neighbouring kingdom of Avanti has the crown prince Aditya Vardhana, who looks precisely like Vikrama Singha, who is very pleasant and tries to spend his time with Jaswanthi, a dancer who dances in the kingdom. The Queen of Avanti is not happy with this behaviour of Aditya Vardhana, and she tries to change his behaviour, and she succeeds in that. She always wanted Aditya Vardhana to marry Alakananda Devi. But when Aditya Vardhana went hunting in the forest, he finds Chandana or Vishakanya and falls in love with her. Chandana also loves him. Later after some incidents, Chandana learns that she is a Vishakanya. She tries to commit suicide but later is saved by Vikrama Simha. He changes Chandana. Aditya Vardhana convinces Vikrama Simha to rule his kingdom till some problems in the kingdom are solved. Vikrama Simha accepts that and later returns the throne to Aditya Vardhana. The Raja Guru of Avanti contrives to procure the throne for his son. Aditya Vardhana marries Chandana. Vikrama Simha finally foils the chief minister's plans to acquire the throne of Dasarna. Vikrama Simha marries Alakananda Devi.

Cast 
 Krishna as Vikrama Simha and Aditya Vardhana
 Jaya Prada as Princess Alakananda Devi
 Kantha Rao as Maharajah of Dasarna
 Radha as Jaswanthi
 Kaikala Satyanarayana as Rajguru
 Mandakini as Chandana Gandhi / Visha Kanya
 Gummadi Minister of Avanti
 M. Balayya as Army chief of Dasarna
 Prabhakar Reddy as Minister of Dasarna
 Giri Babu as Ugra Rahu Army chief of Avanthi
 Amjad Khan as Bhokkudu
 Pradeep Chandran

Production 
Simhasanam is the directorial debut of Krishna. Principal photography took place at Padmalaya Studios, Hyderabad, along with Hogenakkal and Mysore. The film was shot in 60 days. It is the first 70 mm stereophonic sound film in Telugu cinema.

Soundtrack 
The soundtrack was composed by Bappi Lahiri.

Reception 
This was the first film to collect more than 1.5 crore in its first week run. It surpassed the record of highest gross collection in a single theatre in the state in Hyderabad.

References

External links 
 

1980s historical action films
1986 multilingual films
1980s Telugu-language films
1986 films
Films based on Indian folklore
Films scored by Bappi Lahiri
Indian historical action films
Indian multilingual films
Memorials to Vikramaditya
Telugu films remade in other languages